Senator O'Reilly may refer to:

Joe O'Reilly (born 1955), Senate of Ireland
Patrick O'Reilly (Longford politician) (1911–2003), Senate of Ireland
Pauline O'Reilly (fl. 2010s–2020s), Senate of Ireland
Patrick O'Reilly (Cavan politician) (1927–1994), Senate of Ireland

See also
Senator Reilly (disambiguation)